African Music is an annual peer-reviewed academic journal published by the International Library of African Music. It covers contextualized studies of African music and related arts. Articles are made freely accessible after a two-year embargo period.

History
The journal was established by Hugh Tracey in 1954, in the same year as the International Library of African Music. Tracey was the first editor-in-chief until his death in 1977. Publication was interrupted from 2000 until 2007. Since it was re-launched in 2007, the journal includes a collection of music performances and audio examples relating to articles published within the respective issues.

Editors-in-chief
The following persons are or have been editor-in-chief of the journal:
1954–1977: Hugh Tracey
1977–1999: Andrew Tracey
2007–2016: Diane Thram
2017–current: Lee Watkins

Abstracting and indexing
The journal is abstracted and indexed in:
Academic Search Premier
International Bibliography of the Social Sciences
Modern Language Association Database
Music Index
Répertoire International de Littérature Musicale

References

External links

Ethnomusicology
Music journals
Academic journals published in South Africa
English-language journals
Annual journals
Arts journals
Delayed open access journals